The term Daco-Roman describes the Romanized culture of Dacia under the rule of the Roman Empire.

Etymology
The Daco-Roman mixing theory, as an origin for the Romanian people, was formulated by the earliest Romanian scholars, beginning with Dosoftei from Moldavia, in the 17th century, followed in the early 1700s in Transylvania, through the Romanian Uniate clergy and in Wallachia, by the historian Constantin Cantacuzino in his Istoria Țării Rumânești dintru început (History of Wallachia from the beginning), and continued to amplify during the 19th and 20th centuries.

Famous individuals 
 Maximinus Thrax, Roman emperor from 235 to 238, possibly of Carpian origin
 Regalianus was a Roman usurper and became himself emperor for a brief period of time.
 Aureolus was a Roman military commander and would-be usurper against Gallienus.
 Galerius, Roman emperor from 305 to 311
 Constantine I (though more likely of Illyrian origin) was a Roman emperor who ruled between AD 306 and 337, born in what soon became the new Diocese of Dacia south of the Danube river. He was the first Roman emperor to convert to Christianity.
 Ulpia Severina ( 3rd century), the wife of the Emperor Aurelian whose nomen Ulpius was widespread in all the provinces along the Danube may have been from Dacia.
 Leo I, Eastern Roman Emperor from 457 to 474

See also 
 Culture of Ancient Rome
 Dacian language
 Eastern Romance substratum
 Romanian language
 Origin of the Romanians
 Romance languages
 Legacy of the Roman Empire
 The Balkan linguistic union
 History of Romania
 Gallo-Roman
 Thraco-Roman
 Romano-British culture

Notes

References

Further reading 
  Kelley L. Ross The Vlach Connection and Further Reflections on Roman History

Ancient Roman culture
Eastern Romance people
History of the Romanian language
Roman Dacia
Eastern Romance languages
Roman assimilation
Serbia in the Roman era